The Center for the Evaluation of Language and Communication Technologies (CELCT) was an organisation devoted to the evaluation of language technologies, located in Povo, Trento (Italy).

CELCT was established in 2003 by FBK (Fondazione Bruno Kessler) and DFKI (Deutsches Forschungszentrum für Künstliche Intelligenz), and was funded by the Autonomous Province of Trento. The goals of CELCT were "to set up infrastructures and develop skills in order to operate successfully in the field of the evaluation of language and communication technologies, becoming a reference point in the field at the national and European levels."
CELCT interpreted its mission by carrying out several activities in the field of HLT evaluation, mainly focusing on the organization of national and international evaluation campaigns and on the creation of speech and text corpora in different languages and at different linguistic annotation levels.

CELCT's activities were closed on December 31, 2013. The staff working at CELCT at the time of its closure is continuing their research activities within FBK.

European projects 

 TOSCA-MP: Task-oriented search and content annotation for media production
 EXCITEMENT: EXploring Customer Interactions through Textual EntailMENT
 PROMISE: Participative Research labOratory for Multimedia and Multilingual Information Systems Evaluation
 TrebleCLEF: Evaluation, Best Practice & Collaboration for Multilingual Information Access
 EuroMatrix: Statistical and Hybrid Machine Translation Between All European Languages

Other projects 

 LiveMemories: Active Digital Memories of Collective Life - Project funded by the Autonomous Province of Trento  
 OntoText: From Text to Knowledge for the Semantic Web - Project funded by the Autonomous Province of Trento
 Law Making Environment - Project in collaboration with Consiglio Nazionale delle Ricerche

Evaluation campaigns 

CELCT was involved in the following initiatives devoted to the evaluation of Natural Language Processing tools, collaborating with various organizations and networks of excellence both at the national and international level:
 Document Understanding Conference: DUC 2005
 Multilingual Question Answering Track at CLEF (from 2005 to 2013)
 Recognizing Textual Entailment (RTE) Challenges (from 2005 to 2013)
 International Workshop on Spoken Language Translation: IWSLT 2006, IWSLT 2007, IWSLT 2011, and IWSLT 2012
 Evalita: Evaluation of NLP and Speech Tools for Italian (2007, 2009, 2011)
 Cross-Lingual Textual Entailment task  at Semeval (2012 and 2013)

Publications 

CELCT produced a number of scientific publications in all its activity fields.

References 

Science and technology in Italy
Linguistics organizations
Linguistic research institutes